Diocese of Marquette may refer to:

 Episcopal Diocese of Marquette
 Roman Catholic Diocese of Marquette